The Standard Oil Gasoline Station is a historic building once used as a gas station in Plainfield, Illinois.

History
The Lincoln Highway was the first paved road in Plainfield. As the first transcontinental road in America, the road saw very heavy usage and was re-designated U.S. Route 30 in the 1920s. From 1940 to 1957, U.S. Route 66 ran concurrently with US 30 on the same section of Lincoln Highway through Plainfield, creating substantial traffic. Plainfield's location on the routes made it a prime location for refuelling stations.

The station is a fusion of the "Domestic" and "Spanish" style gas stations that Standard Oil designed in the early 20th century. The Domestic elements were intended to represent a cottage, promoting a mom-and-pop atmosphere, while the Spanish style incorporated southwestern architecture. Like most Standard Oil stations at the time, the color scheme was red, white, and blue.

Built during the Great Depression, the Plainfield station features less ornamentation than stations during the 1920s due to economic concerns; instead, large panes of plate glass were used along the sides of the station. The station was added to the National Register of Historic Places on November 13, 1984. It is a contributing property to the Downtown Plainfield Historic District.

Architecture
The brick building has a stucco finish. The original metal roofing is intact. A small addition, built from cement block with a flat roof, was later constructed as a car wash. Four piers emerge from the roof and are decorated with glass-globed electric lights; the north two piers are further ornamented with a simple belt course. The two wooden doors have recessed panels below a window. The paint scheme was at one point changed to orange and yellow, but has been changed back to its original red, white and blue.

See also 
 Standard Oil Gasoline Station (Plant City, Florida)
 Standard Oil Gasoline Station (Odell, Illinois)
 Standard Oil Gasoline Station (Bowling Green, Kentucky)
 National Register of Historic Places listings in Will County, Illinois

References

National Register of Historic Places in Will County, Illinois
Transport infrastructure completed in 1932
Buildings and structures on U.S. Route 66
U.S. Route 66 in Illinois
Retail buildings in Illinois
Gas stations on the National Register of Historic Places in Illinois
Individually listed contributing properties to historic districts on the National Register in Illinois
Transportation buildings and structures in Will County, Illinois
1932 establishments in Illinois
Transportation in Will County, Illinois
Standard Oil